Faisal Ibrahim Suleiman is a retired Jordanian footballer of Palestinian origin.

International career
An international friendly match between was played between Jordan and Iraq on 16 September 2010 in Amman at the King Abdullah Stadium to mark Faisal's retirement, which resulted in a 4-1 victory for Jordan. After playing the first few minutes of the match, Faisal gave the captain armband to his teammate Hassouneh Al-Sheikh as well as his #16 jersey shirt to his younger teammate Basem Fat'hi.

International goals

Honors and Participation in International Tournaments

In AFC Asian Cups 
2004 Asian Cup

In Pan Arab Games 
1997 Pan Arab Games 
1999 Pan Arab Games

In Arab Nations Cup 
1992 Arab Nations Cup
1998 Arab Nations Cup
2002 Arab Nations Cup

In WAFF Championships 
2000 WAFF Championship  
2002 WAFF Championship 
2004 WAFF Championship 
2007 WAFF Championship

References
The Jordanians Defeat the Iraqis in a Friendly During the Mark of Faisal Ibrahim's Retirement

External links 

1976 births
Living people
Jordanian footballers
Jordan international footballers
Jordanian people of Palestinian descent
2004 AFC Asian Cup players
Association football defenders
Al-Shabab FC (Riyadh) players
Al-Wehdat SC players
Jordanian Pro League players
Sportspeople from Amman
Saudi Professional League players
Jordanian expatriate sportspeople in Saudi Arabia
Expatriate footballers in Saudi Arabia
Jordanian expatriate footballers